"Afraid to Feel" is a song by British duo LF System. The mix was created in 2019 and picked up for full release on 2 May 2022, by Warner Music UK. The single rose to popularity in June 2022 and spent eight consecutive weeks at number one in the UK Singles Chart and six non-consecutive weeks at number two in Ireland. The song prominently samples the Philadelphia International Records act Silk's 1979 song "I Can't Stop (Turning You On)", with Louise Clare Marshall's vocals slowed down and sped up throughout the single.

Writing and composition
The duo found the original track in 2019 while looking for samples to use for loops and vocals. The duo interpolated and re-recorded the original vocal sample from Silk as a replayed use to avoid sample clearance issues. "I Can't Stop (Turning You On)" was a slower 85bpm with "Afraid to Feel" at an uptempo 130bpm, the tempo was altered after playing around with the sample in Ableton Live. The style of production is both similar and pays homage to a disco edit, which started in the 70s to upstart a dance floor, involving cutting one part of a song and chopping it into a different part of the song structure.

Critical reception
Griff of Knights of the Turntable opined that the song was an "irresistible soul-soaked cut" with "heartfelt, slow moments to pumping" next to "pumping, euphoric house grooves". The duo brings a "pure sense of joy throughout" the song.

In May 2022, the song was chosen "Hottest Record" by Clara Amfo on BBC Radio 1.

Chart performance
On the UK Singles Chart, the song reached number 13 when it moved up 56 places from number 69 in its second week on the chart, for the issue dated 10 June 2022. "Afraid to Feel" rose to number one on 8 July.

Charts

Weekly charts

Year-end charts

Certifications

References

2019 songs
2022 singles
UK Singles Chart number-one singles
Warner Music Group singles